The 1916 New Mexico gubernatorial election was held on November 7, 1916.

Incumbent Democratic Governor William C. McDonald did not run for re-election but ran instead for Lieutenant Governor. 

Democratic nominee Ezequiel Cabeza De Baca defeated Republican nominee Holm O. Bursum.

General election

Candidates
Ezequiel Cabeza De Baca, Democratic, incumbent Lieutenant Governor
Holm O. Bursum, Republican, Republican candidate for Governor in 1911
N. A. Wells, Socialist

Results

Notes

References

1916
New Mexico
Gubernatorial